KLR or klr may refer to:

 Kalmar Airport, Sweden (IATA code KLR)
 Kawartha Lakes Railway, Ontario, Canada
 Kawasaki KLR650, a dual-sport motorcycle
 Whistlestop Valley, formerly the Kirklees Light Railway, West Yorkshire, UK
 Khaling language (ISO code klr)